Andrea Tabanelli (born 2 February 1990) is an Italian footballer who plays as a midfielder. He can also play as a right winger.

Playing career

Cesena
Tabanelli was born in Ravenna in 1990. He joined AC Cesena and after loan spells at A.C. Bellaria Igea Marina and AC Giacomense, he became a regular for Cesena. On 1 November 2013, Tabanelli scored his first goal for AC Cesena  against Ternana in a 1–1 draw. He celebrated the goal by pulling out his shin pad and pretending to use it as a mobile phone. On 16 November 2013, Tabanelli signed an extended contract with AC Cesena until 2017.

Cagliari Loan
After impressing during the first half of the 2013/14 season for Serie B side A.C. Cesena, Tabanelli signed on loan for Serie A Side Cagliari on 27 January 2014 with the option of a permanent move.

Tabanelli made his debut for Cagliari as a second-half substitute on 12 April 2014 in a 1–1 draw against Sassuolo. His first start for Cagliari came on 11 May 2014, when he started in Central Midfield in the 1–0 defeat against Chievo.

Proposed Leeds United loan
Days after signing for Cagliari, Tabenelli was signed by Leeds United on loan on January transfer deadline day by prospective Leeds owner Massimo Cellino, the  move coming hours after the alleged sacking of manager Brian McDermott. Tabanelli was able to be loaned by Cagliari to Leeds because 'international loans' are recognized as normal transfers allowing players to be loaned stretching from transfer window to transfer window.

After being reinstated as Leeds manager, Brian McDermott revealed that on 3 February that Gianluca Festa was still present in training, however this time acting as a translator for new signing Andrea Tabanelli. Tabanelli was signed in between the window of McDermott's 'sacking' and his reinstatement as manager. McDermott revealed that the move was under scrutiny by the Football League as to see if Tabanelli's signing would be sanctioned.

On 7 February 2014, it was revealed that Tabanelli's transfer to Leeds had been cancelled as the signing 'did not comply with Football League regulations' and he returned to Cagliari.

Frosinone
On 15 January 2020, he signed with Frosinone in Serie B.

Loan to Pescara 
On 1 February 2021, Tabanelli moved to Serie B club Pescara, on a loan deal.

Career statistics

References

External links

1990 births
Living people
Italian footballers
Cagliari Calcio players
A.C. Cesena players
Leeds United F.C. players
Pisa S.C. players
Calcio Padova players
U.S. Lecce players
Frosinone Calcio players
Delfino Pescara 1936 players
Serie A players
Serie B players
Association football midfielders
Sportspeople from Ravenna
Footballers from Emilia-Romagna